Otto I (1117 – 11 July 1183), called the Redhead, was Duke of Bavaria from 1180 until his death. He was also called Otto VI as Count Palatine of Bavaria from 1156 to 1180. He was the first Bavarian ruler from the House of Wittelsbach, a dynasty which reigned until the abdication of King Ludwig III of Bavaria in the German Revolution of 1918.

Life
Duke Otto I was probably born at Kelheim, the son of Count Palatine Otto IV of Wittelsbach and Heilika of Pettendorf-Lengenfeld, a granddaughter of the Hohenstaufen duke Frederick I of Swabia. He was the brother of Archbishop Conrad I of Mainz and Salzburg. Upon the death of his father in 1156, he succeeded him as Count palatine of the Bavarian duchy, then under the rule of Henry the Lion, a scion of the Welf dynasty.

As one of the best knights in the employ of Emperor Frederick Barbarossa in 1155 he had prevented a defeat of the Emperor near Verona, where the army caravan was ambushed on the way back to Germany after the coronation at Rome. In the Dominium mundi conflict between emperor and pope culminating at the 1157 Reichstag of Besançon, fiery Otto could only be kept from smiting the papal legate Cardinal Rolando Bandinelli with his battleaxe by the personal intervention of Frederick.

He was finally rewarded with the duchy of Bavaria on 16 September 1180 at Altenburg in Thuringia, after the deposition of Duke Henry the Lion. But he was so little regarded by many of the Bavarian aristocracy that they are said to have refused him the customary homage. They went so far as to refuse to attend his first court assembly at Regensburg.

With the separation of Styria under Duke Ottokar IV in the same year, Bavaria lost the last of her southeastern territories. With the support of the emperor and his brother Conrad, Otto was able to secure the rule of his dynasty from the wary Bavarian nobility. His descendants ruled Bavaria for the next 738 years.

In 1182 or 1183, Duke Otto bought Dachau castle, the ministeriales, and all other appurtenances for a large sum of cash from the widow of the last duke of Dachau and Merania, Conrad II, Duke of Merania.

In 1183 Otto accompanied Emperor Frederick to sign the Peace of Constance with the Lombard League and died suddenly on the way back at Pfullendorf in Swabia. He was succeeded by his only surviving son Louis. Otto's mortal remains are buried in the crypt of Scheyern Abbey.

Issue 

About 1169 Otto married Agnes, a daughter of Count Louis I of Loon. Agnes and Otto had the following children:
 Otto (1169–1181)
 Ulrich († 29 May...)
 Agnes (1172 - 13 January 1200), married in 1186 to Henry von Plain
 Heilika I (1171-1200), married in 1184 to Hallgrave Dietrich of Wasserburg
 Agnes (1172–1200), married Count Henry of Plain (d. 1190)
 Richardis (1173–1231), married in 1186 to Count Otto I of Guelders and Zutphen
 Louis I (1173–1231), married in 1204 to Ludmilla of Bohemia
 Heilika II (1176-1214), married Count Adelbert III of Dillingen (d. 1214)
 Elisabeth (1178-1190), married Count Berthold II of Vohburg (d. 1209)
 Mechtild (1180–1231), married in 1209 to Count Rapoto II of Ortenburg (1164–1231).
 Sophia (1170–1238), married Landgrave Hermann I of Thuringia (1155–1217)

Ancestry

References

Sources

 
 
 
 
 
 
 

1117 births
1183 deaths
12th-century dukes of Bavaria
People from Kelheim
Counts Palatine of the Holy Roman Empire
Otto 01 Wittelsbach, Duke of Bavaria